Kakhaber Kakashvili (born 26 June 1993), commonly known as Kakha, is a Georgian football forward who currently plays for Pars Jonoubi in the Persian Gulf Pro League.

References

External links

1993 births
Living people
Machine Sazi F.C. players
Expatriate footballers in Iran
Footballers from Georgia (country)
Expatriate sportspeople from Georgia (country) in Iran
Gostaresh Foulad F.C. players
Persian Gulf Pro League players
Association football midfielders
Pars Jonoubi Jam players
Expatriate footballers from Georgia (country)
Erovnuli Liga players